Alex Dea is an American composer.

Life and work
Alex Dea was trained in Western classical music and received a Ph.D. in Ethnomusicology from Wesleyan University, with a specialty in Javanese gamelan music. He was a performer in La Monte Young's experimental music group Theatre of Eternal Music. Other mentors include prominent avant-garde composers Terry Riley and Robert Ashley. He has also studied the musics of Africa and Japan – and studied raga with the Hindustani master Pandit Pran Nath. Dea recently works in the gamelan form. One of his gamelan compositions, In Pelog, is the result of his collaboration with Prof. Dr. Sumarsan, an Indonesian teaching at Wesleyan University.

Footnotes

References
Potter, Keith (2000). Four Musical Minimalists: La Monte Young, Terry Riley, Steve Reich, Philip Glass. Music in the Twentieth Century series. Cambridge, UK; New York, New York: Cambridge University Press.

Living people
20th-century classical composers
Minimalist composers
Experimental composers
Postmodern composers
American male classical composers
American classical composers
21st-century classical composers
Just intonation composers
Contemporary classical music performers
Pupils of Pran Nath (musician)
Year of birth missing (living people)
Place of birth missing (living people)
Wesleyan University alumni
21st-century American composers
20th-century American composers
20th-century American male musicians
21st-century American male musicians